Sidi Mogdoul was a Moroccan Wali and religious leader who lived in the 11th-century.  He was buried in Essaouira.

Sidi Megdoul came from the noble Berber tribe of Regraga, and was credited with renewing the Ribat of Sidi Chiker. From his base in Essaouira, he fought the Berghwata confederacy and later allied with the Almoravids and participated in the propagation of their Da'wa.

The saint also gave his name to the nearby lighthouse, 17 meter high, named the Sidi Mogdoul lighthouse.

Notes

11th-century Berber people
11th-century Moroccan people
People under the Almoravid dynasty
Moroccan religious leaders
Moroccan military leaders
People from Essaouira